Elise Gatien (born July 14, 1988) is a Canadian actress. She is known for her role as Candice "CJ" Ward in the Cartoon Network live-action series Tower Prep.

Life and career
Gatien was born in Kamloops, British Columbia, Canada. She is of half German descent on her dad's side.  She began performing at the age of four. She trained for a number of years in dance and musical theater. She was discovered at a model/talent convention and had a number of opportunities in Asia.

In 2009, Gatien played Mia Dearden in two episodes of Smallville. Her other television credits include Supernatural, Bionic Woman, Eureka, The Guard, and roles in the films In the Land of Women and Dr. Dolittle: Tail to the Chief.

In 2010, Gatien was cast as CJ Ward in the Cartoon Network live-action series Tower Prep. She was cast in The CW's 2012 pilot The Selection based on books written by Kiera Cass; however, the pilot was not picked up to series. In 2015, Gatien played the starring role of Jamie in the 1980s horror homage film Lost After Dark.

Filmography

Film

Television

References

External links

21st-century Canadian actresses
Actresses from British Columbia
Canadian child actresses
Canadian film actresses
Canadian television actresses
Female models from British Columbia
Living people
People from Kamloops
1988 births